Jonathan Elmore (born December 20, 1995) is an American professional basketball player for the Sioux Falls Skyforce of the NBA G League. He played college basketball for Marshall where he broke various records.

High school
Born in Charleston, West Virginia, Elmore averaged 31.4 points as a senior at George Washington High School in Charleston and was West Virginia player of the year. In the class of 2014, he was NR by ESPN and a 2 star recruit by 247 Sports.

College career
He originally committed to play at VMI where his father, Gay Elmore, played. However, he left VMI before ever playing a game to be with his grandfather. He joined an intramural team at Marshall and was recruited to varsity by December 2015. In the 2016–17 season, he averaged 19.7 points per game and was a first team all-Conference USA selection. In his junior season 2017–18, Elmore led Marshall to their first Conference USA tournament championship and was named MVP of the tournament. Marshall then received an automatic berth to the NCAA Tournament and Elmore led the Herd to their first NCAA Tournament win, an upset of Wichita State, tallying 27 points. He averaged 22.7 points and 6.8 rebounds per game as a junior. After the season Elmore declared for the 2018 NBA Draft but did not hire an agent, thus leaving open the possibility of returning to Marshall, which he did.

In his senior season, Elmore scored his 2,000th point in a November 28, 2018 game against William & Mary, becoming the third player in school history to achieve the milestone. On March 3, 2019, Elmore became the Conference USA all-time leading scorer, passing UTEP’s Stefon Jackson. Earlier in the season, Elmore became the conference’s all-time assist leader (passing UTEP’s Julyan Stone), making him the only current player leading a conference in both categories. Jon Elmore is the first player in NCAA Division 1 history to have over 2,500 points and over 750 assists. On March 19, 2019 Elmore became Marshall’s all-time leading scorer, breaking the record held by Skip Henderson. Elmore was then surpassed just four years later by Taevion Kinsey.

Statistics
Source

|-
| align="left" | 2015–16
| align="left" | Marshall
| 25 || 25 || 34.6 || .376 || .345 || .803 || 3.4 || 5.8 || 0.8 || 0.1 || 15.2
|-
| align="left" | 2016–17
| align="left" | Marshall
| 35 || 34 || 35.1 || .413 || .352 || .807 || 4.3 || 5.9 || 1.1 || 0.2 || 19.7
|-
| align="left" | 2017–18
| align="left" | Marshall
| 36 || 35 || 38.3 || .438 || .355 || .826 || 5.8 || 6.7 || 1.6 || 0.4 || 22.7
|-
| align="left" | 2018–19
| align="left" | Marshall
| 37 || 37 || 35.9 || .393 || .364 || .787 || 5.1 || 5.1 || 1.7 || 0.5 || 20.2
|- class="sortbottom"
| style="text-align:center;" colspan="2"| Career
| 133 || 131 || 36.1 || .409 || .356 || .808 || 4.8 || 5.9 || 1.4 || 0.3 || 19.8

Professional career

2019–2020 season
After going undrafted, Elmore joined the Boston Celtics to play in the NBA Summer League. On July 23, 2019 Elmore signed with Pallacanestro Trieste of the Italian league, Lega Basket Serie A (LBA). He averaged 7.5 points, 2 rebounds and 1.9 assists per game. On January 15, 2020, Elmore signed with Orlandina Basket of the Italian second division where he averaged 17 points per game.

2020–2021 season
On December 5, 2020, Elmore signed with Ionikos of the Greek Basket League. On January 12, 2021, it was revealed that he had signed with Soproni KC of the Hungarian Nemzeti Bajnokság. Elmore averaged 17.3 points, 3.5 rebounds, 3.5 assists and 1.1 steals per game.

2021–2022 season
On August 14, 2021, Elmore signed with Larisa of the Greek Basket League, but did not make his debut with the club. On August 17, Elmore signed a one-year deal with BC Šiauliai of the Lithuanian Basketball League.

Sioux Falls Skyforce (2022–present)
In October 2022, it was reported Elmore signed with the Sioux Falls Skyforce of the NBA G League for the 2022–2023 season.

The Basketball Tournament
Elmore played in The Basketball Tournament 2019 for the WV Wildcats, they were defeated in the first round by Big X. Elmore joined Herd That, a team composed primarily of Marshall alumni, in The Basketball Tournament 2020. The team is coached by his father, Gay Elmore. He scored 23 points as Herd That fell to Overseas Elite 93–76 in the quarterfinals.

Personal life
Elmore comes from a basketball family. Born and raised in Charleston, West Virginia, by his father and mother, Gay and Elizabeth Elmore. His father, Gay Elmore, was VMI's all-time leading scorer and his grandfather, Otmer, played basketball at West Virginia. His brother, Ot, played basketball at Texas–Rio Grande Valley before transferring to Marshall to play alongside Elmore. On March 9, 2019, he became engaged to his long-term girlfriend and former Marshall University student-athlete, Tori Dent.

See also
List of NCAA Division I men's basketball career scoring leaders

References

External links
Jon Elmore at eurobasket.com
Jon Elmore at RealGM.com
Marshall Thundering Herd bio

1995 births
Living people
American expatriate basketball people in Greece
American expatriate basketball people in Hungary
American expatriate basketball people in Italy
American expatriate basketball people in Lithuania
American men's basketball players
Basketball players from West Virginia
BC Šiauliai players
George Washington High School (Charleston, West Virginia) alumni
Ionikos Nikaias B.C. players
Lega Basket Serie A players
Marshall Thundering Herd men's basketball players
Orlandina Basket players
Pallacanestro Trieste players
Point guards
Sioux Falls Skyforce players
Sportspeople from Charleston, West Virginia